Przełęcz Karkonoska (literally "Karkonosze Pass"; , literally "Silesian Pass") is a mountain pass in the central Giant Mountains on the Polish-Czech border. At , it is the lowest point of the main ridge of the Giant Mountains.

In the Czech Republic, the area is also referred to as Špindlerova bouda ("Špindler's Hut"), after a mountain hut located there. Another chalet, situated on the Polish side of the border, is called Odrodzenie.

Tourism

The pass is accessible by a road either from Špindlerův Mlýn, served by bus, or from Poland. The Polish road is said to be one the steepest roads in Poland with the average inclination 7.2%, reaching 24% at maximum. Although road quality on the Polish side is relatively poor, the pass is much sought after by mountain bikers. The pass is a hub of hiking trails, including the Polish–Czech Friendship Trail.

History
During World War II, the area was incorporated into Nazi Germany as part of the Sudetes. At that time, the Nazis held the allied prisoners in Špindlerova bouda. On the other hand, the Silesian (today Polish) mountain hut, was confiscated by Nazis as a property of a Jew and converted into a boarding house for Hitlerjugend members, and later into a hotel for Nazi officers.

See also
 List of highest paved roads in Europe
 List of mountain passes

References

Mountain passes of Poland
Sudetes
Czech Republic–Poland border crossings